The Bulgarian State Football Championship in the 1937 season was contested by 14 teams. The championship was won by Levski Sofia, which defeated Levski Ruse 1-1, 3-0.

First round

|}

Quarter-finals

|}

Semi-finals

|-
!colspan="3" style="background-color:#D0F0C0; text-align:left;" |Replay

|}

Final

First game

Second game

References
Bulgaria - List of final tables (RSSSF)

Bulgarian State Football Championship seasons
1
1